MovieCD is a format for digital video storage and consumer home video playback released in 1996 by Sirius Publishing, and was rendered obsolete by the wider distribution of DVD. It used a video codec called MotionPixels, marketed by MotionPixels, Inc., a subsidiary of Sirius Publishing (founded by Darrel Smith and Richard Gnant). It was used in many third-party video games from the mid to late-1990s, and during the same time on Sirius's MovieCDs that it had been originally developed for, enjoying an international  distribution in both forms.

Both MovieCDs and the MotionPixels codec remain an issue today in that medium market availability of MovieCDs remained until around the year 2000 and some of the above-mentioned video games still have a cult following, both producing malfunctions in modern PCs due to the outdated MotionPixels codec.

Origins and development 
The MotionPixels (MP) codec used on MovieCDs originated with the Huygen codec developed by Christian Huygen, David Whipple, and Darrell Smith.

Specifications and system requirements 

The MP codec offered a resolution of 320x236 pixels, 16-bit high color, and 16 frames per second fullscreen playback at a datarate of (in theory) up to about 520kB/sec, without having to install MPEG or acquire additional hardware, on Microsoft Windows systems from Windows 3.x on. Audio was saved in plain WAV format. Its FourCC code was, depending on version, "MVI1" or "MVI2."

For viewing MovieCDs, Sirius recommended a 486 processor or higher, at least 8 MB of RAM, and a 2x-speed CD-ROM drive (most MovieCDs had a data rate of about 280-300 kB/sec). MovieCDs had a running time of about 45 minutes each, so feature films often were stored on two or three discs in one box, and the consumer had to swap discs to watch the whole movie.

The codec avoided digital compression artifacts such as the pixelization or block artifacts (seen in VCDs using MPEG-1) by treating areas of the frame as objects rather than dividing it into blocks. Its output was always RGB; however, the viewer could choose between different settings of chroma subsampling for encoding, from RGB through YCrCb 4:2:2 all the way to 16:1:1 which ensured for low datarates at what were high resolutions at the time, while a particularly low chroma subsampling made for a distinctively analogue video look to today's eyes, with spatially (not temporally) smeared colors and sharp luma.

MVI1 
MVI1 was a purely DOS-based codec, carrying its animations in an .MVI container. Apparently, the only occasion it was ever used was with Sirius's game Treasure Quest.

MVI2 
MVI2 was the Windows incarnation of the MotionPixels codec, and always came with its own player, the MotionPixels Movie Player. MVI2 files used the AVI container still popular today. It saw international distribution during the mid- to late-1990s in the form of Sirius's MovieCDs and many third-party video games (such as the Caesar series by Sierra). MVI2 came in three versions:
 aware31.exe: Aware31 was developed for Windows 3.1x.
 aware95.exe: Aware95 was developed for Windows 95.
 awarent.exe: AwareNT was developed for Windows NT and released in 1998.

Economic viability 
Given the dominance of the VCD and DVD formats, MovieCD never gained a significant following.

Compatibility and issues with modern PCs

Compatibility 
All MovieCDs had the MVI2 codec on them ready to install, and most video games with them installed both codec and player without asking the user. Both are still an issue today due to the wide availability of MovieCDs until around 2000 and the cult following some of these games still have. Both versions of the MP codec installing executable for Windows remain available on the web from third-party downloading sites for free manually as well as within codec packs.

The codec's Windows 3.x and 95 version still runs more or less on Windows 98; however the videos often crash as this version of the codec was still a pre-DirectX artifact, even though they can even be played with any other video players on Windows 95 and Windows 98 once the MP codec is installed.

On Windows NT, Windows 2000, and Windows XP, MP's NT version awarent.exe is needed. MP videos run stable on these Windows versions, and the codec can even be used to encode own videos into MotionPixels files, however serious other issues arise no matter which version of MVI2 is installed.

Issues 
As soon as any version of the MotionPixels codec Windows version MVI2 is installed on any post-Win98 Windows OS, any video and audio-editing software on the same system may crash as soon as a codec-choosing dialogue for saving a file is opened. Additionally, players might be unable to read a variety of other audio and video codecs, and a variety of other both software and hardware-related video problems might occur, such as TV-cards ceasing to function.

Running MotionPixels's uninstall routine that only removes the MotionPixels Player, not the codec itself, and not even Windows Control Panel can be used to de-install the MP codec, so the only way to get rid of it and reclaim a working system is to manually delete any single file containing the letters MVI in the Windows registry and the \WINDOWS\SYSTEM32 directory.

MovieCD catalogue
The catalogue of both TV and feature film programs available on MovieCDs mostly spawned from deals with New Line Home Video, Anchor Bay, Alliance, Trimark, Rhino, and Central Park Media, with a total of 131 titles released, offering genres such as action, comedy, anime, computer animation and music performance.

List of titles

1997 Playboy Playmate Video Calendar
1998 Playboy Playmate Video Calendar
Adult StreetSmart
The Adventures of Mole
The Adventures of Toad
Alien Autopsy: Fact or Fiction
Arcade
The Art of Nature
Beach Babes from Beyond
Best of Playboy's Strip Search
Best of SNL: The Best of Gilda RadnerBest of SNL: 15th Anniversary SpecialBest of SNL: The Best of Dan AykroydBest of SNL: The Best of John BelushiBest of SNL: Classic Years, Volume 1Best of SNL: Classic Years, Volume 2Best of SNL: Hosted by Eddie MurphyBest of SNL: SNL Goes CommercialBetty Boop CartoonsBeyond the Mind's EyeBullySmartBurns and AllenCabbage Patch Kids: The ClubhouseCabbage Patch Kids: The New KidCabbage Patch Kids: The Screen TestCartoon FestivalCher, Extravaganza: Live at the MirageChronosClass of Nuke 'Em HighClassic CartoonsThe Clones of Bruce LeeComedy CapersComedy GreatsComic Relief VIIComputer Animation Festival, Volume 1Computer Animation Festival, Volume 2Cyber City Oedo 808: Data OneDominion: Tank Police - Part 1Dominion Tank Police - Part 2Don Juan DeMarcoDr. Katz, Volume 1Dr. Katz, Volume 2Dragon FistDumb & DumberElvis in HollywoodFirst BloodFridayThe Gate to the Mind's EyeGenocyber, Part 1: Birth of GenocyberGhost in the ShellThe Grateful Dead, Dead AheadThe Grateful Dead, Ticket to New Year'sJimi Hendrix, Jimi Plays MontereyJimi Hendrix, Rainbow BridgeHouse PartyImaginariaImaginitJason Goes to Hell: The Final FridayThe Kids in the HallThe Lawnmower ManThe Lawnmower Man 2: Jobe's WarLeprechaunLeprechaun 2The Little Shop of HorrorsThe LouvreMacross Plus, Part 1Macross Plus Part 2
Macross Plus, Part 3
Macross Plus, Part 4
Barry Manilow, The Greatest Hits
The Mask
Menace II Society
Military Aircraft Video Report - Volume III, Number 1
The Mind's Eye
The Monkees, Volume 1
The Monkees, Volume 2
Monterey Pop
Mortal Kombat
Mumfie: The Movie
New Dominion Tank Police - Part 1
New Dominion Tank Police - Part 2
Night of the Living Dead
A Nightmare on Elm Street 4: The Dream Master
Ninja Scroll
One Step Beyond
Patrick Stewart Narrates "The Planets"
Playboy 21 Playmates Centerfold Collection Volume 1
Playboy's Biker Babes: Hot Wheels & High Heels
Playboy's Cheerleaders
Playboy's College Girls
Playboy's Girls in Uniform
Playboy's Girls of the Internet
Playboy's Sorority Girls
Playboy's Voluptuous Vixens
Playboy's Wet & Wild VIII: Bottoms Up
The Player
The Poetry Hall of Fame, Volume 1
The Poetry Hall, Volume 2
Poison Ivy
Politically Incorrect: The Political Domain
Power Moves
The Princess Bride
Pump Up the Volume
Puppet Master
Quadrophenia
Reefer Madness
Return of the Living Dead 3
Roswell: Cover Ups & Close Encounters
Rowan Atkinson Live
The Rutles: All You Need is Cash
The Secret Adventures of Tom Thumb
Seven
Sex Madness
StrangerSmart
Subspecies
Teenage Mutant Ninja Turtles
Time Capsule World War II: Europe/Pacific
Trancers III
Urotsukidoji III: Return of the Overfiend - Episode 1
Urotsukidoji III: Return of the Overfiend - Episode 2
Urotsukidoji III: Return of the Overfiend - Episode 3
Urotsukidoji III: Return of the Overfiend - Episode 4
VH1: Guitar Legends
VH1: Psychedelic High
VH1: Rock in the U.K.
Warlock
Warlock: The Armageddon
Wes Craven's New Nightmare
 The Who, The Kids Are Alright
Whore
Witchcraft

References

External links 
Classic Home Toys - Installment #6: What in the world was the Sirius MovieCD?
A detailed technical description of the MotionPixels codec on MultimediaWiki
A comparison test of the MotionPixels codec next to contemporaries Cinepak and Indeo 3.2, by Bob Currier, Synthetic Aperture
Aware NT codec for playback of movieCD AVI files on Windows XP computers.

Compact disc
Rotating disc computer storage media
Discontinued media formats
Video codecs
Video formats
Video storage